Yercaud block  is a revenue block of Salem district of the Indian state of Tamil Nadu. This revenue block consists 9 panchayat villages. They are:
 Manjakuttai
 Maramangalam
 Nagalur
 Semmanatham
 Thalaisolai
 Vazhavanthi
 Vellakkadai
 Velur
 Yercaud

References 

Revenue blocks of Salem district